Pinara is a genus of moths in the family Lasiocampidae. The genus was erected by Francis Walker in 1855.

Species 

 Pinara adusta Walker, 1869
 Pinara albida Walker, 1865
 Pinara apicalis Walker, 1855
 Pinara australasiae Fabricius, 1775
 Pinara calligama Felder, 1874
 Pinara cana Walker, 1855
 Pinara chlorosacca Turner, 1902
 Pinara cinerata Walker, 1865
 Pinara cycloloma Turner, 1902
 Pinara decorata Walker, 1865
 Pinara divisa Walker, 1855
 Pinara erubescens Lower, 1894
 Pinara fervens Walker, 1855
 Pinara flexicosta Felder, 1874
 Pinara guttularis Walker, 1855
 Pinara intemerata Walker, 1865
 Pinara marginata Walker, 1855
 Pinara metaphaea Walker, 1862
 Pinara nana Walker, 1855
 Pinara nasuta Lewin, 1805
 Pinara nasutula Wallengren, 1861
 Pinara obliqua Walker, 1855
 Pinara parvigutta Walker, 1855
 Pinara plinthopa Turner, 1904
 Pinara pudorina Walker, 1865
 Pinara rubida Walker, 1865
 Pinara rufescens Butler, 1886
 Pinara rufescens Walker, 1855
 Pinara saturata Walker, 1865
 Pinara sesioides Walker, 1866
 Pinara simonis Guenée
 Pinara sobria Walker, 1865
 Pinara spodopa Turner, 1904

References

 Encyclopedia of Life

Lasiocampidae
Moth genera